Sean Simon Andrew Fraser  (born June 1, 1984) is a Canadian politician who has served as the minister of immigration, refugees and citizenship since October 26, 2021. A member of the Liberal Party, Fraser has represented the riding of Central Nova in the House of Commons of Canada since the 2015 federal election.

Early life and education
Raised in Merigomish in Pictou County, Nova Scotia, Fraser earned a Bachelor of Science degree at St. Francis Xavier University in 2006. He then studied law at Dalhousie University and at Leiden University in the Netherlands, graduating in 2009.

Legal career
He spent three years working in Calgary as an associate at Blake, Cassels & Graydon LLP, and also did work related to the Promotion of Access to Information Act for a NGO in South Africa.

Awards 
Fraser was selected as "Best Orator" and was a finalist for "Rising Star" during Macleans 12th annual Parliamentarians of the Year award.

Electoral record

References

External links

1984 births
Schulich School of Law alumni
Leiden University alumni
Liberal Party of Canada MPs
Living people
Members of the 29th Canadian Ministry
Members of the House of Commons of Canada from Nova Scotia
Members of the King's Privy Council for Canada
People from Antigonish, Nova Scotia
St. Francis Xavier University alumni
21st-century Canadian politicians